Operário Ferroviário Esporte Clube, more commonly referred to as Operário Ferroviário, Operário de Ponta Grossa or simply Operário-PR, is a Brazilian professional association football club in Ponta Grossa, Paraná which currently plays in Série C, the third tier of Brazilian football, as well as in the Campeonato Paranaense, the top division of the Paraná state football league.

They competed in Série A once.

History
The team was founded on 1 May 1912, thus being the second oldest club in the state of Paraná. The club won the Southern Zone Campeonato Paranaense Second Level in 1969. Operário competed in the Série A in 1979 and in the Série B in 1980, 1989, 1990, 1991 and 2019.

Stadium
They play their home games at the Germano Krüger stadium. The stadium has a maximum capacity of 10.632 people.

Notable players
 Gilberto William Fabbro
 Schumacher 
 Peixoto
 Simão
 Chicão
 Sosa
 Danilo Báia

Honours
 Campeonato Brasileiro Série C
 Winners (1): 2018

 Campeonato Brasileiro Série D
 Winners (1): 2017

 Campeonato Paranaense
 Winners (1): 2015

Taça FPF
Winners (1): 2016

 Campeonato Paranaense Second Division
 Winners (3): 1916, 1969, 2018

Current squad

References

Operário Ferroviário Esporte Clube
Football clubs in Paraná (state)
Association football clubs established in 1912
Ponta Grossa
1912 establishments in Brazil
Campeonato Brasileiro Série C winners
Campeonato Brasileiro Série D winners